Madhi railway station is a railway station in Tapi district of Gujarat state of India. It is under Mumbai WR railway division of Western Railway Zone of Indian Railways. It is located on Udhna–Jalgaon main line of the Indian Railways.

It is located at 45 m above sea level and has three platforms. As of 2016, electrified double broad-gauge railway line exists at this station. Passenger, MEMU and Superfast trains halt here.

See also
 Tapi district

References

Railway stations in Tapi district
Mumbai WR railway division